Progress M-20 was a Russian unmanned Progress cargo spacecraft, which was launched in 1993 to resupply the Mir space station.

Launch
Progress M-20 launched on 11 October 1993 from the Baikonur Cosmodrome in Kazakhstan. It used a Soyuz-U rocket.

Docking
Progress M-20 docked with the aft port of the Kvant-1 module of Mir on 13 October 1993 at 23:24:46 UTC, and was undocked on 21 November 1993 at 02:38:43 UTC.

Decay
It remained in orbit until 21 November 1993, when it was deorbited. The VBK-Raduga 10 capsule was jettisoned at 08:50 UTC, immediately before reentry. The mission ending occurred at 09:03 UTC, when the VBK-Raduga capsule landed across the Kazakh border from the Russian city of Orsk.

See also

 1993 in spaceflight
 List of Progress missions
 List of uncrewed spaceflights to Mir

References

Progress (spacecraft) missions
1993 in Kazakhstan
Spacecraft launched in 1993
Spacecraft which reentered in 1993
Spacecraft launched by Soyuz-U rockets